Careful, He Might Hear You is a 1983 Australian drama film. It is based on the 1963 novel of the same name by Australian-American author Sumner Locke Elliott.

Plot
The film stars Wendy Hughes and Robyn Nevin as two sisters who are locked in a custody battle over their young nephew, PS, played by Nicholas Gledhill.  PS has been raised by his aunt Lila (Nevin) and her husband George since his mother died soon after his birth. When Lila's richer sister Vanessa (Hughes) returns from overseas, she seeks custody of PS, citing the opportunities she can give him.

Production
There had long been interest in making a film out of the novel. In the 1960s it was announced that Joshua Logan would direct a movie version starring Elizabeth Taylor but this did not come to pass. Film rights to the novel were bought by Jill Robb who hired Mike Jenkins to adapt the screenplay and Carl Schultz to direct. Funding was obtained from the New South Wales Film Corporation among others.

After an extensive search, Nicholas Gledhill, son of actor Arthur Dignam was cast as PS.

The film was shot in and around Sydney, mostly in Neutral Bay and Darling Point. The Hordern Family garden and mansion, Babworth House, in Darling Point was used in filming.

Box office
Careful, He Might Hear You grossed $2,431,126 at the box office in Australia. The movie also enjoyed a successful release in North America.

Home media
A Collector's Edition of Careful, He Might Hear You was released on DVD with a new print by Umbrella Entertainment in June 2008. The DVD is compatible with all regional codes and includes special features such as the film trailer, bonus trailers, a still photo gallery, an interview with Sumner Locke Elliot and interviews with stars Wendy Hughes, Nicholas Gledhill and Jill Robb.

A regular edition of the film with reduced special features was released on DVD by Umbrella Entertainment in October 2008.

Accolades

See also
 Cinema of Australia

References

External links
Careful, He Might Hear You at the National Film and Sound Archive
Careful He Might Hear You at Oz Movies
 
 
 

1983 films
1983 drama films
Australian drama films
1980s English-language films
Films about children
Films about dysfunctional families
Films based on American novels
Films based on Australian novels
Films directed by Carl Schultz
Films set in the 1960s